The 2003 Rally Argentina (formally the 23rd YPF Rally Argentina) was the fifth round of the 2003 World Rally Championship. The race was held over four days between 8 May and 11 May 2003, and was based in Villa Carlos Paz, Argentina. Peugeot's Marcus Grönholm won the race, his 15th win in the World Rally Championship.

Background

Entry list

Itinerary
All dates and times are ART (UTC−3).

Results

Overall

World Rally Cars

Classification

Special stages

Championship standings

Production World Rally Championship

Classification

Special stages

Championship standings

References

External links 
 Official website of the World Rally Championship

Argentina
Rally Argentina
Rally